There are two species of skink named starry forest skink:
 Sphenomorphus annamiticus, a species found in Vietnam and Cambodia
 Sphenomorphus stellatus, a species found in Malaysia